

Medal summary

BMX

Mountain biking

Road cycling

Men

Women

Track cycling

Men

Women

Medal table

External links
  2011 Southeast Asian Games

2011 Southeast Asian Games events
2011
2011 in track cycling
2011 in road cycling
2011 in cycle racing
2011 in BMX